Norway competed at the 2020 Summer Olympics in Tokyo. Originally scheduled to take place from 24 July to 9 August 2020, the Games were postponed to 23 July to 8 August 2021, because of the COVID-19 pandemic. Since the nation's debut in 1900, Norwegian athletes have appeared in every edition of the Summer Olympic Games, except for two occasions: the 1904 Summer Olympics in St. Louis and the 1980 Summer Olympics in Moscow, due to the country's support for the United States-led boycott.

Medalists

Competitors
The following is the list of number of competitors in the Games. Note that reserves in handball are not counted:

Athletics

Norwegian athletes further achieved the entry standards, either by qualifying time or by world ranking, in the following track and field events (up to a maximum of 3 athletes in each event):

Track & road events
Men

Women

Field events

Combined events – Men's decathlon

Canoeing

Sprint
Norway qualified a single boat (men's K-1 1000 m) for the Games by winning the silver medal at the 2021 European Canoe Sprint Qualification Regatta in Szeged, Hungary.

Qualification Legend: FA = Qualify to final (medal); FB = Qualify to final B (non-medal)

Cycling

Road
Norway entered a squad of six riders (four men and two women) to compete in their respective Olympic road races, by virtue of their top 50 national finish (for men) and top 22 (for women) in the UCI World Ranking. The full cycling squad was named to the Norwegian roster for the Games on July 1, 2021.

Track
Following the completion of the 2020 UCI Track Cycling World Championships, Norway entered one rider to compete in the women's omnium based on her final individual UCI Olympic rankings.

Omnium

Mountain biking
Norway qualified one mountain biker for the men's Olympic cross-country race, as a result of her nation's eighteenth-place finish in the UCI Olympic Ranking List of 16 May 2021.

BMX
Norway received a single quota place for BMX at the Olympics by finishing among the top three nations vying for qualification in the men's race based on the UCI BMX Individual Ranking List of June 1, 2021.

Diving

Anne Vilde Tuxen represents Norway in the Women's 10m platform event. She is the first female Norwegian diver to qualify for the Olympics since 1988.

Equestrian

Norway entered two riders into the Olympic equestrian competition by the following results: a top two finish each, outside the group selection, of the individual FEI Olympic Rankings for Group A (North Western Europe) in dressage and jumping, respectively, marking the country's recurrence to the sport after an eight-year absence.

Ellen Birgitte Farbrot and her horse Red Rebel obtained the minimum eligibility requirements to compete in dressage but eventually withdrew, resulting in Norway losing a qualification berth.

Jumping

Golf

Norway entered two male and one female golfers into the Olympic tournament. Marianne Skarpnord qualified but later withdrew.

Gymnastics

Artistic
Norway entered two artistic gymnasts into the Olympic competition. Sofus Heggemsnes and Julie Erichsen received a spare berth each from the men's and women's apparatus events, respectively, as one of the highest-ranked, neither part of the team nor qualified directly through the all-around, at the 2019 World Championships in Stuttgart, Germany.

Men

Women

Handball

Summary

Men's tournament

Norway men's national handball team qualified for the Olympics by securing a top-two finish at the Podgorica leg of the 2020 IHF Olympic Qualification Tournament.

Team roster

Group play

Quarterfinal

Women's tournament

Norway women's national handball team qualified for the Olympics by securing a top-two finish at the Podgorica leg of the 2020 IHF Olympic Qualification Tournament.

Team roster

Group play

Quarterfinal

Semifinal

Bronze medal game

Rowing

Norway qualified three boats for each of the following rowing classes into the Olympic regatta, with the majority of crews confirming Olympic places for their boats at the 2019 FISA World Championships in Ottensheim, Austria.

Qualification Legend: FA=Final A (medal); FB=Final B (non-medal); FC=Final C (non-medal); FD=Final D (non-medal); FE=Final E (non-medal); FF=Final F (non-medal); SA/B=Semifinals A/B; SC/D=Semifinals C/D; SE/F=Semifinals E/F; QF=Quarterfinals; R=Repechage

Sailing

Norwegian sailors qualified one boat in each of the following classes through the 2018 Sailing World Championships, the class-associated Worlds, and the continental regattas.

Men

Women

Mixed

M = Medal race; EL = Eliminated – did not advance into the medal race

Shooting

Norwegian shooters achieved quota places for the following events by virtue of their best finishes at the 2018 ISSF World Championships, the 2019 ISSF World Cup series, European Championships or Games, and European Qualifying Tournament, as long as they obtained a minimum qualifying score (MQS) by May 31, 2020.

Swimming

Norwegian swimmers further achieved qualifying standards in the following events (up to a maximum of 2 swimmers in each event at the Olympic Qualifying Time (OQT), and potentially 1 at the Olympic Selection Time (OST)):

Taekwondo

Norway entered one athlete into the taekwondo competition at the Games. Richard Ordemann secured a spot in the men's welterweight category (80 kg) with a top two finish at the 2021 European Qualification Tournament in Sofia, Bulgaria.

Triathlon

Norway entered four triathletes (three men and one woman) to compete at the Olympics. Rio 2016 Olympian Kristian Blummenfelt, along with rookies Gustav Iden, Casper Stornes, and Lotte Miller, was selected among the top 26 triathletes vying for qualification in their respective events based on the individual ITU World Rankings of 15 June 2021.

Volleyball

Beach
Norway men's beach volleyball pair qualified directly for the Olympics by virtue of their nation's top 15 placement in the FIVB Olympic Rankings of 13 June 2021.

See also
 Norway at the 2020 Summer Paralympics

References

Nations at the 2020 Summer Olympics
2020
2021 in Norwegian sport